Jonathan Hiatt Nicolson Dermot Irwin (born 21 June 1941), is a former blood stock agent, auctioneer, stud owner, publisher and racetrack executive. In 1997, he founded the Jack and Jill Foundation with his wife Mary Ann O'Brien, to provide home health care to severely sick babies. It was set up as a direct response to the Irwin’s experience of caring at home for their son Jack, born with severe brain damage in 1996.

Biography

Family and early life 

Irwin was born into an Anglo-Irish family. His father, John Irwin (1913-1975), was an Irish actor, writer and a BBC producer and his mother Philippa Hiatt (b.1918), was a British stage and screen actress. He spent his early childhood in Coleshill, Buckinghamshire and later in Holland Park, London. He was educated at Eton College, Berkshire, and Trinity College, Dublin.

Personal life 

On 22 February 1964 he married Mikaela Rawlinson (b.17 July 1941), the eldest daughter of Peter Rawlinson, Baron Rawlinson of Ewell, (1919-2006), and Rawlinson's first wife, Haidee Rawlinson (née Kavanagh). He and Mikaela had four children: Pirate Irwin (b.1965), Luke Irwin (b.1967), Jago Irwin (b.1971) and Samson Fortune Irwin (1982 – 2000).

Irwin divorced Mikaela in 1989 after which he married Mary Ann O'Brien on 17 March 1991. With Mary Ann O'Brien, he had three sons and two daughters: Lily Irwin, Phonsie, John Irwin (died in infancy), Jack Irwin (29 February 1996 – 13 December 1997) and Molly Irwin.

Career

British Bloodstock Agency 

Irwin's interest in racing began at Eton where he shared in a school bookmaking team with William Pigott-Brown and Jonathan Sheppard, son of Jockey Club Handicapper Dan Sheppard. By his second term at Trinity, his interest in racing had begun to overshadow his studies, when a friend of his mother's, the ex-Battle of Britain pilot Wing Commander Tim Vigors, asked him to join his Dublin bloodstock agency at IR£5 a week. Vigors and his partner Tom Cooper he singles out as the main influences in his life. "Integrity and a knowledge of the business I learnt from them." When Vigors moved to England, the business was bought out by the British Blood Stock Agency and was subsequently renamed British Bloodstock Agency (Ireland) Ltd, and went on to be one of the leading bloodstock agencies in the country.

By his mid-twenties Irwin was to become the director and remained with the company for fifteen years until 1974.  During his time with the B.B.A. (Ireland) Ltd. he was perhaps best known for originating and introducing the Irish Stallion Incentive Scheme which was so successful that it morphed into the European Breeders Fund. He was elected a Member of the Irish Turf Club 1976. Irwin forged many valuable international connections and was largely responsible for the development of the highly lucrative Japanese trade in the late sixties and early seventies.

Irish Horseman Magazine 
Irwin launched Irish Horseman in the 1960s which was to become the country's most popular thoroughbred publication. With a £100 capital and the floor of his flat in Fitzwilliam Square for offices, he and two friends started the Irish Horseman's Magazine to fill a gap in Irish publishing and, having got it on its feet, he sold out to the Farmer's Journal.  The Irish Horseman was a platform to promote the Irish horse and this single aim was the overriding reason which resulted in his move to Goffs Bloodstock Sales in 1974.

Goffs 

Robert J. Goff established Goffs in 1866 and was the only thoroughbred auction house in the country. Historically the 'cream' of the Irish yearling crop had up to that time been sold in England, at Tattersalls.

In 1974 Irwin was approached by the Irish senator and racing patron Paddy McGrath to manage Goffs, then a small private company on the verge of bankruptcy. In the same year, Goffs were advised by their landlords that their sales complex in Dublin was to be sold. Goffs, who had auctioned at Ballsbridge for more than eighty years, suddenly found themselves siteless when their landlords, the Royal Dublin Society, sold the paddocks to Allied Irish Banks for more than £4 million and then failed to come up with an alternative that satisfied either Goff's or the members of the Irish Bloodstock Breeders Association.

Irwin was an early convert to the Myerscough family's brain-child of moving their sales to Kill, Co. Kildare. According to Irwin, "as various negotiations continued, it became clear to me that we could not return to the R.D.S. and be beholden to the same landlords as in the past with no security of tenure. I was in Australia when I heard the news that the R.D.S., whose Professor James Meenan had earlier given his blessing to the Kill project, had executed a volte-face and were back in contention."

Irwin felt that action was needed and got in touch with John Finney of Fasig Tipton USA, an American equine auctioneer firm, who agreed to come in. Thereafter there was no great problem in raising the finance but the group of underwriters had certain reservations about the existing management structure in Goffs. As a compromise he agreed to take the job. Thus Irwin replaced Robert Myerscough as managing director of R.J. Goff and Co. Ltd. on 1 January 1975 and oversaw the construction of the world's first purpose built bloodstock sales complex in Kill. The cost of the proposed complex to be built on a 74.6 acre site at Kill - was estimated at £1.8 million as far back as August, 1974.  According to Irwin he didn't want merely the most modern and best equipped sales complex, he also wanted a whole new approach to business within the horse industry. He was mortified "that class distinction should still be so rampant. It is difficult for an outsider to learn even how to buy a horse at a sale. Younger people just have to be attracted and to them and to everybody else my door will always be open."

Irwin's previous experience influenced the company turnover increase from £3.2 million in 1975 to £44 million by 1989.  Many features introduced by Goffs have now become commonplace and his adaption of the Australian 'Million' incentive concept to the Cartier Million is recognised as one of the most successful innovations, introducing a whole new world of owners into horseracing. The Phoenix Park racetrack was rescued from closure in 1981 and in the nine years until it was sold for redevelopment became recognised as the most innovative track in Europe with the second largest betting and attendance figures in Ireland. It was unique in the world that every single one of the 120 races run annually at the track was sponsored.

Dublin International Sports Council 
Irwin was appointed CEO of the Dublin International Sports Council (DISC) in 1993 under the chairmanship of Dr. Tony O'Reilly.  The objective of the DISC was to raise Dublin's profile as a host venue for international sport and to lobby the government to provide facilities of international standard. Projects included the 1994 Women's Hockey World Cup, the 1995 Men's EuroHockey Nations Championship, the 1996 Notre Dame vs U.S. Naval Academy football game, and the first three stages of the 1998 Tour de France in Dublin. DISC also produced a research document for Dublin to bid for the 2012 and 2016 Summer Olympics.

The Jack and Jill Foundation 
The Jack and Jill Foundation was established by Irwin and his wife Mary Ann, as a result of their experiences following the birth of their son Jack in 1996. Due to complications shortly after birth, Jack developed severe brain-damage, which left him without sight or hearing, and unable to swallow. In a manner that shocked Irwin, he was advised by medical practitioners to abandon the baby in hospital. After ignoring that advice, they found themselves effectively abandoned instead, with no support-system in place to help them care for Jack at home.

The family suffered significant trauma, and encountered a series of bureaucratic obstacles, before an offer of help from a retired nurse provided a catalyst which sustained them through the remaining months of their son's short life. Other nurses became involved with Jack's care, and out of the seeds of family anguish, fresh hopes grew for others.

According to Irwin, he was profoundly shocked and angered to discover that there was no respite-aid available to parents in their circumstances until the baby reached the age of four. "We wanted to ensure that other families would not have to go through the same sort of ordeal, and we set up the Jack and Jill Children's Foundation to help provide a comprehensive range of support services for babies and their families."

The organisation campaigns to improve services for young children with disabilities, but Irwin says that progress towards reform of the system has been slow. Jack and Jill has been providing a network of support for individual families.

Since 1997, the foundation has supported 1600 families throughout Ireland. It has raised €36 million from the private sector while receiving €4.5 million from the Irish health service. Awards received include Charity of the Year 2003, Irish Personality of the Year 2004, Irish Fundraiser of 2011 and Global Fundraiser of 2011.

References

Further reading 
 
 

1941 births
Living people
People educated at Eton College
British businesspeople
Renua Ireland politicians